Here Alone is a post-apocalyptic film directed by Rod Blackhurst. Written by David Ebeltoft, the film premiered at the 2016 Tribeca Film Festival and was released theatrically on March 30, 2017.

Plot 

Sometime after a zombie-like infection decimates the world's population, Ann (Lucy Walters) struggles to survive in the woods. There are few resources and she is forced to live off the land, as abandoned houses attract dangerous, infected corpses. Throughout, Ann clings to the hope of civilization, listening to a crank radio that broadcasts an emergency message in French, a language she does not understand, and other reminders of her past life.

That past life includes her husband, Jason (Shane West), and child, an infant daughter. They are gone, and the movie explains their fate through a series of flashbacks.

On her way back from getting food from a nearby home, Ann comes across an injured man, Chris (Adam David Thompson), and his teenage stepdaughter, Olivia (Gina Piersanti). She helps them, nursing Chris back to health, but finds it difficult to trust him or Olivia.

A short time later, Chris and Olivia are about to leave when a storm rolls in; Ann allows them to stay a little while longer. Time passes and Chris and Ann form a romantic relationship, much to Olivia's irritation.

It is revealed later on that after leaving to find supplies for Ann and their daughter during the night, Jason was attacked and killed by the infected, leaving Ann to protect their child. One day, when she leaves to find food, she kills one of the infected; unknown to Ann, blood splatters onto her coat. She returns to find her daughter crying but unharmed. When Ann comforts her, the blood from her coat accidentally gets in her daughter's mouth.

Ann's daughter develops circular rashes on her belly, a telltale sign of infection. Left with no other options, Ann grinds up a bottle of aspirin, mixes it with baby formula, including droplets of her own blood, and feeds it to her daughter.

Ann decides to go North with Chris and Olivia. To do this, they must gather food from the house Ann has regularly searched so that they're able to make the journey; while Chris distracts the infected gathered in the yard, Ann and Olivia sneak into the house and start searching for food. While Ann is distracted, Olivia knocks her out, ties her up, screams, then takes the food and runs back to camp. Ann escapes, then finds Olivia and Chris under attack by the infected that Olivia drew with her scream.

Only Olivia and Ann have survived. In the car, driving down the road, Olivia rests her head on Ann's lap; Ann screams in pain and frustration over the ordeal she endured.

Cast 
 Lucy Walters as Ann
 Gina Piersanti as Olivia
 Shane West as Jason
 Adam David Thompson as Chris

Reception 
Here Alone received generally positive reviews from critics. Rotten Tomatoes, the film holds an approval rating of 66% based on 32 reviews, with an average rating of 6.1/10. The site's critics' consensus reads: "Here Alone may not suffer from an overabundance of narrative substance, but it offers enough post-apocalyptic action to satisfy.." On Metacritic, the film received an aggregate critic score of 59 out of 100, based on 4 critics, indicating "mixed or average reviews".

The film received the Audience Award at the 2016 Tribeca Film Festival and later received the Best Actress Award at the Tallgrass Film Festival and the Empire State Filmmaker Award from the St. Lawrence International Film Festival.

References

External links 
 
 

2016 films
American post-apocalyptic films
American zombie films
2016 horror films
Films about viral outbreaks
American survival films
2010s survival films
Films shot in New York City
Films set in New York City
2010s English-language films
2010s American films